Concordia Schools can refer to:
 Concordia Parish School Board - A public school district in Louisiana
 The Concordia Schools - A private school system in Los Angeles